The baritone voice is typically written in the range from the second G below middle C to the G above middle C (G2–G4) although it can be extended at either end. However, the baritone voice is determined not only by its vocal range, but also by its timbre, which tends to be darker than that of the typical tenor voice.

The term baritone was developed in relation to classical and operatic voices, where the classification is based not merely on the singer's vocal range but also on the tessitura and timbre of the voice. For classical and operatic singers, their voice type determines the roles they will sing and is a primary method of categorization. In non-classical music, singers are defined by their genre and their gender and not by their vocal range. When the terms soprano, mezzo-soprano, contralto, tenor, baritone, and bass are used as descriptors of non-classical voices, they are applied more loosely than they would be to those of classical singers and generally refer only to the singer's perceived vocal range.

Successful non-classical baritones display a wide range of vocal qualities and effects that lend a unique character to their voices, many of which are considered undesirable in the operatic or classical baritone singer, such as "breathy" (Jim Reeves), "crooning" (Ville Valo), "growling" (Neil Diamond), and even "ragged" (Bruce Springsteen).

The following is a list of singers in various music genres and styles (most of which can be found on the List of popular music genres) who have been described as the best baritones.

List of names

See also
 List of basses in non-classical music
 List of contraltos in non-classical music
 List of mezzo-sopranos in non-classical music
 List of sopranos in non-classical music
 List of tenors in non-classical music
 Voice classification in non-classical music
 Voice type

Notes

References

Lists of musicians
Lists of singers